Mos Def & Talib Kweli Are Black Star (often called simply Black Star) is the debut studio album by Black Star, a hip hop duo consisting of emcees Talib Kweli and Mos Def (the latter of whom now goes by Yasiin Bey). The album was released on September 29, 1998, to critical acclaim. The title is a reference to the Black Star Line, a shipping line founded by Pan-Africanist Marcus Garvey. The album deals with modern-day issues, philosophical ideas, and life in Brooklyn, New York City as the two artists know it.

Background
The album's fruition came about from the chemistry between the two emcees.  Both planned to release their solo albums around the same time, but they postponed their individual projects and decided instead to collaborate on a full-length LP. The album's cover was designed by artist Brent Rollins.

Music and lyrics 

The late jazz musician Weldon Irvine played the keys on the album's opening song, "Astronomy," which interprets the word "black" in a positive way, and contains similes such as "Black, like my baby girl's hair". The next song, and first single, "Definition", is a stern response to hip hop's fascination with death, and a dedication to slain emcees Tupac Shakur and the Notorious B.I.G. As the chorus goes, "One two three/Mos Def and Talib Kweli/We came to rock it on to the tip top/Best alliance in hip hop, Y-O/I said, one two three/It's kinda dangerous to be a MC/They shot 2Pac and Biggie/Too much violence in hip hop, Y-O". The chorus is also a play on Boogie Down Productions' anti-gun song "Stop the Violence", as well as "Remix For P Is Free" from their album Criminal Minded. "Children's Story" is a re-imagined version of Slick Rick's original, which features Mos Def cautioning overly materialistic pursuits.

"Brown-Skin Lady" is an affectionate tribute to brown-skinned women. The song encourages black and brown women to be proud of their hair and complexion, and to not be influenced by Western beauty standards. Kweli rhymes, "We're not dealin' with the European standard of beauty tonight/Turn off the TV and put the magazine away/Look in the mirror tell me what you see/I see the evidence of divine presence."

"Thieves in the Night" was inspired by author Toni Morrison's novel The Bluest Eye. In the album's liner notes, Kweli explains that the paragraph "struck me as one of the truest critiques of our society, and I read that in high school when I was 15 years old. I think it is especially true in the world of hip hop, because we get blinded by these illusions." The excerpt interpolated in the song is as follows: "And fantasy it was, for we were not strong, only aggressive; we were not free, merely licensed; we were not compassionate, we were polite; not good but well-behaved. We courted death in order to call ourselves brave, and hid like thieves from life." And the version on the track: "Not strong, only aggressive/Not free, we only licensed/Not compassionate, only polite (now who the nicest?)/Not good but well-behaved/Chasin' after death so we could call ourselves brave, still livin' like mental slaves/Hiding like thieves in the night from life/Illusions of oasis making you look twice."

Critical reception 

Black Star was voted the 24th best album of 1998 in the Pazz & Jop, a poll of American critics nationwide published annually by The Village Voice. Robert Christgau, the poll's creator, wrote in a contemporary review that Mos Def and Talib Kweli "devise a hip hop imaginary where hater players lose their girls-not-bitches to MCs so disinterested they give 'em right back. The rhymes are the selling point. But the subculture that cares most about these words is what you'll come back to." According to Encyclopedia of Popular Music writer Colin Larkin, the album abandoned "the negativity of gangsta rap" in favor of "a highly intelligent and searching examination of black culture, harking back to the classic era of rap epitomized by Public Enemy and KRS-One. The album's sparse, hard-hitting rhythms were also in marked comparison to the overblown productions of Puff Daddy, which dominated the rap mainstream."

Track listing

Album singles

Personnel
Hi-Tek – Producer, Cut, Crowd Noise
Weldon Irvine – Keyboards, performer
Jim Godsey – Engineer
Charlie Mack – Engineer
Kieran Walsh – Engineer, Mixing
Vinia Mojica – Performer
DJ Evil Dee – Cut
Jane Doe – Performer
Rick St. Hillaire – Mixing
Steve Souder – Mixing
Chris Athens – Mastering
Ken "Duro" Ifill – Mixing
Eddie Otchere – Photography
Vaughn Sessions – Engineer
Mr. Walt – Producer, engineer, Mixing
Success – Engineer
Brent Rollins – Artwork, Cover art
Mos Def – Fender Rhodes, performer
Black Star – Artwork, Art Direction
Talib Kweli – Producer, performer
Marcus Garvey – Photography
Ge-ology – Producer, Crowd Noise
88 Keys – Producer
Pat Viola – Engineer
Jake Septimus – Photography
Tasleem – Photography
Richard Mason – Crowd Noise
J. Rawls – Producer
Kieran Dee – Photography/Banter/Dietician

Chart positions

Weekly charts

Singles

References

External links 
 

Black Star (group) albums
1998 debut albums
Talib Kweli albums
Mos Def albums
Rawkus Records albums
Albums produced by Hi-Tek
Albums produced by 88-Keys
Albums produced by J. Rawls
Progressive rap albums